Paul Duboc (2 April 1884 – 19 August 1941) was a French professional road bicycle racer from 1907 through 1927.  Despite winning 5 career stages in the Tour de France, he may be most remembered for being disqualified at the 1919 Tour de France for borrowing a car to go and repair his pedal axle.
In 1911, Duboc was close to winning the Tour de France, when he became ill after drinking from a poisoned bottle given to him. His fans were blaming the classification leader Gustave Garrigou, and the Tour organizers advised Garrigou to ride under disguise. Duboc would end the 1911 Tour de France in second place, his best result.

Major results

1907
Paris-Rungis
1908
 11th, Overall, Tour de France
1909 – Alcyon
 1st, Overall, Tour of Belgium
 4th, Overall, Tour de France
 1st, Stage 13, (Brest - Caen, 415 km)
 2nd, Stage 10, (Bayonne - Bordeaux, 269 km)
 3rd, Stage 6, (Grenoble - Nice, 345 km)
1911
 2nd, Overall, Tour de France
 1st, Stage 8, (Marseille - Perpignan, 335 km)
 1st, Stage 9, (Perpignan - Bagnères-de-Luchon, 289 km)
 1st, Stage 11, (Bayonne - La Rochelle, 379 km)
 1st, Stage 14, (Cherbourg - Le Havre, 361 km)
1914
 31st, Overall, Tour de France
1919
 8th, Overall, Tour de France (but later disqualified)
1923
 18th, Overall, Tour de France
1926
 27th, Overall, Tour de France

External links 

French male cyclists
French Tour de France stage winners
Doping cases in cycling
1884 births
1941 deaths
Sportspeople from Rouen
Cyclists from Normandy